Gare du Nord is a 2013 French-Canadian drama film about four individuals whose lives meet at the Gare du Nord in Paris. Directed and co-written by Claire Simon, the film stars Nicole Garcia, Reda Kateb, François Damiens and Monia Chokri. The film premiered at the Locarno International Film Festival and was released theatrically on 4 September 2013.

Cast 

 Nicole Garcia as Mathilde 
 Reda Kateb as Ismaël 
 François Damiens as Sacha
 Monia Chokri as Joan
 Sophie Bredier as Agatha
 Michael Evans as the violent man
 Lucille Vieaux as lingerie shop woman
 Marvin Jean Charles as Kako
 Jean-Christophe Bouvet as  the lawyer
 Nader Boussandel as Antoine 
 Lou Castel as Ali 
 André Marcon as François
 Jacques Nolot as Mario
 Samir Guesmi as Julien 
 Ophélia Kolb as the mistress
 Paweł Pawlikowski as Joan's boss
 Christophe Paou as Gaspard

Accolades

References

External links 
 

2013 films
2013 romantic drama films
French romantic drama films
Canadian romantic drama films
Rail transport films
French-language Canadian films
2010s Canadian films
2010s French films